Proteins: Structure, Function, and Bioinformatics is a monthly peer-reviewed scientific journal published by John Wiley & Sons, which was established in 1986 by Cyrus Levinthal. The journal covers research on all aspects protein biochemistry, including computation, function, structure, design, and genetics. The editor-in-chief is Nikolay Dokholyan (Penn State College of Medicine).

Publishing formats are original research reports, short communications, prediction reports, invited reviews, and topic proposals. In addition, Proteins includes a section entitled "Section Notes", describing novel protein structures.

Abstracting and indexing 
Proteins is abstracted and indexed in:

According to the Journal Citation Reports, the journal has a 2020 impact factor of 3.756.

References

External links 
 

Biochemistry journals
Publications established in 1986
Monthly journals
Wiley (publisher) academic journals
Molecular and cellular biology journals
English-language journals